Roy Francesco Salvadori (12 May 1922 – 3 June 2012) was a British racing driver and team manager. He was born in Dovercourt, Essex, to parents of Italian descent.  He graduated to Formula One by 1952 and competed regularly until 1962 for a succession of teams including Cooper, Vanwall, BRM, Aston Martin and Connaught. Also a competitor in other formulae, he won the 1959 24 Hours of Le Mans in an Aston Martin with co-driver Carroll Shelby.

In 47 starts he achieved two F1 Championship podium finishes: third place at the 1958 British Grand Prix and second place at that year's German Grand Prix, and won non-championship races in Australia, New Zealand and England. In 1961 he was lying second in the United States Grand Prix when his Cooper's engine failed.  At the end of 1962 he retired from F1, and stopped racing altogether a couple of years later to concentrate on the motor trade. He returned to the sport in 1966 to manage the Cooper-Maserati squad for two seasons, and eventually retired to Monaco.

Racing career

Early career
With his ambition thwarted by World War II, Salvadori began his career in 1946, racing purely for pleasure, in minor events, in a MG and an ex-Brooklands offset Riley racer before stepping up to an ex-Tazio Nuvolari Alfa Romeo P3 in 1947. It was with this car, he raced in the 1947 Grand Prix des Frontières, where late into the race, his Alfa would remain stuck in top gear. Despite this, Salvadori still cruised home to record an impressive fifth place. He then decided to become a professional racing driver, and drove a number of different makes as his career progressed.

In the May 1951 BRDC International Trophy race at Silverstone, Salvadori had a serious accident when his Frazer Nash Le Mans Replica somersaulted two and a half times, ejecting him into the hay bales. He was in a critical condition, suffering a fractured skull and other severe injuries which left him so close to death he was given the last rites.

King of the Airfields
Salvadori knew his limitations, and realized that chasing the likes of Stirling Moss at circuits like steeply cambered, high-banked Dundrod or Pescara, with its blind bends and flat-out blinds, was futile, verging on suicidal. Though he wasn't alone in that, he became known as "King of the Airfields", accumulating wins at Silverstone, Snetterton and flat English airfield tracks.

Salvadori twice won the Oulton Park's International Gold Cup where there were plenty of trees to hit and a lake to plunge into, which he did once driving a Jaguar Mk.II 3.8 saloon. Nor was the Le Mans Mulsanne Straight at night a place for the careless or nervous, nevertheless he scored his most notable success there in an Aston Martin DBR1/300 in 1959.

Salvadori's association with tractor magnate David Brown and his Feltham-built Aston Martin sports cars, GTs and F1 underscored his career; he joined Brown's team in mid-1953, and would label his 1963 defeat of Ferrari's 250 GTO at Monza in its DP214 in the Inter-Europa Cup, as his favourite victory.

Formula One

Salvadori recovered sufficiently from his Silverstone accident to make his first entry into Grand Prix racing in 1952 when he drove a two-litre four cylinder Ferrari 500 in the British Grand Prix for G. Caprara, finishing eighth, three laps down. He would continue to race the Ferrari, winning the Joe Fry Memorial Trophy. For the 1953 season, Salvadori joined the Connaught team and competed in five Grands Prix with the Connaught "A type" but retired from all of them.  However, he did secured a number of non-championship victories during the season.

Between 1954 and 1956 Salvadori drove a Maserati 250F in Formula One for Syd Greene's Gilby Engineering team, taking a numerous good results in predominantly non-championship F1 races, with one entry for Officine Alfieri Maserati in the 1954 Swiss Grand Prix where he did not start and the car was driven by Sergio Mantovani. It was in the 1956 RAC British Grand Prix at Silverstone when only a similarly 250F mounted Moss shaded him and a possible victory was lost to a fuel line problem, marked him out as a potential top-level driver. However, he remained particularly active in domestic motor sport and in sports cars for Aston Martin.

Following his Championship debut in 1952, Salvadori would experience retirement after retirement. Out of the ten races contested between 1953 and 1956, he would retire early in every single one of them. But this all change in 1957, when he signed with Cooper achieving only one fifth place at RAC British Grand Prix. However, 1958 (as teammate to Jack Brabham) was his most successful season, finishing fourth in the World Drivers' Championship for Cooper, behind Mike Hawthorn, Stirling Moss and Tony Brooks. Over the course of the season, he would earn two podium finishes, including a second place in the German Grand Prix. However he was not retained by Cooper for 1959 (when Brabham would win the first of his titles) but drove a privately entered Cooper, as well as the works Aston Martin, in which he achieved two sixth-place finishes. The Aston Martin was a traditional front engined car, which was soon outclassed by the Cooper rear engined concept. He did, however, win the London Trophy at Crystal Palace with a Formula Two Cooper. The Aston Martin team continued into 1960 but again without success and Salvadori also continued with the privately entered Cooper.

For 1961, Salvadori moved to Reg Parnell's Yeoman Credit Racing team as partner to John Surtees, competing in five Grands Prix and achieving three sixth-place finishes with the team's 1.5-litre Cooper T53-Climax. The Cooper now had strong competition in the form of Colin Chapman's Lotus cars, but Salvadori was catching Innes Ireland for the lead in the United States Grand Prix at Watkins Glen when the engine failed. He continued with Parnell for 1962, now under the Bowmaker Racing Team name with the Lola Mk4-Climax, but eight attempts yielded seven retirements and one failure to start (as John Surtees took the car). 1962 was Salvadori's last season in Formula One. The season had begun with a nasty accident in a Cooper during qualifying for the Warwick Farm '100' in Australia, which left him with a temporary facial paralysis.

Sports cars
Throughout his Formula One career, Salvadori continued to participate in many other classes, particularly within the United Kingdom and became very well-known domestically as a result.  Throughout 1951 and 1952 seasons, while taking part in sportscar races throughout England, he would become a regular on the podium and would win his first race at the BARC Goodwood in 1952. He would follow this victory up with another at Snetterton and Goodwood later on in the season. He would then sweep all of the events as part of the National meeting at Thruxton. 1953 would see Salvadori earn more podium finishes with a few victories.  However, his first attempt at the 24 Hours of Le Mans, driving a works Aston Martin would not fare well. Co-driving with George Abecassis, the clutch failure would lead to the pair retiring early. He impressed with his aggressive press-on attitude, when he finished second in the Internationales ADAC-1000 km Rennen Weltmeisterschaftslauf Nürburgring in an Ecurie Ecosse Jaguar C-Type, shared with Ian Stewart

Ever since he started racing sportscars in the upper levels during the 1950s, he was usually a sure bet to finish in the top five, whether it was in national or international races. However, in 1959, he would achieve a run of success of which even the best would find themselves envious. Although he only finished one race in the year to March, over the next three months Salvadori would go on an incredible run of success. The run started with a second place in the British Empire Trophy race but followed that with two straight victories in the Aintree 200 and an International race at Silverstone. And then, a pair of second-place finishes and another victory, this time at the National Open race at Crystal Palace in the middle of May. It was on to the Circuit de la Sarthe for the 24 Hours of Le Mans.

1959 24 Hours of Le Mans
Salvadori was entered in the race by David Brown Racing Dept. in an Aston Martin DBR1/300, partnered by the same co-driver he had had at the 12 Hours of Sebring earlier on in the year, Texan Carroll Shelby. Attrition would be a constant participant and the field would be down to just 13 cars, heading the surviving cars was that of Salvadori and Shelby. The Englishman would bring the car across the finish line giving himself and Brown the Le Mans victory each had been longing for many years. This would be the high point of his sports car career, especially as Shelby was afflicted by dysentery, therefore Salvadori did the lion's share of the driving. Before the end of the season, he would score four more victories to make it his best season.

He followed the '59 season with another successful season in 1960, scoring five victories, including a run of four wins in five races. While at Le Mans, he allowed his co-driver, Jim Clark sufficient scope to express himself, but provided enough wise counsel for the pairing to finish third in the Border Reivers' DBR1. 1961 would see him take two victories at Crystal Palace on the same day, plus a string of other podium finishes  He returned to the winning ways at the Circuit de la Sarthe in 1962, when he shared a Jaguar E-Type with Briggs Cunningham. The pair finished fourth overall, but won their class.  A year later, he spun on oil dropped by Bruce McLaren's Aston Martin DP214 during the early stages of the race and flipped his E-Type onto its roof; the car then burst into flames. Jean-Pierre Manzon in his Aerodjet LM6 hit Salvadori and stopped in the middle of the track. Christian Heins was unable to avoid the wreckage; his car swerved out of control, hit another car, spun into a lamp car, and exploded in flames. Salvadori and Manzon were both injured; Heins died instantly. The accident ultimately led to Salvadori retiring from racing in early 1965, after finished second in the Whitsun Trophy race at Goodwood, abroad a Ford GT40. His last sportscar victory came the season before in the Scott-Brown Memorial at Snetterton.

Salvadori returned to Formula One as a team manager for the Cooper racing team in 1966 and 1967. However, after a disagreement with the team, he left and focussed on his own business. Away from the track, he was involved with a car dealership in Surrey between 1968-1969. Salvadori was also involved in the early stages of the Ford GT40 project but resigned, when the machine's handling appeared problematic, without accepting a fee for his services.

Salvadori retired to Monaco in the late 1960s. He died in Monaco on 3 June 2012 at the age of 90, three weeks after the death of his co-driver at Le Mans in 1959, Carroll Shelby.

Family life
Salvadori married Susan Hindmarsh, one of the daughters of racing driver, long distance record breaker and 'round the world' driver Violette Cordery and her husband, the racing driver and aviator John Stuart Hindmarsh.

Racing record

Career highlights

Complete Formula One World Championship results
(key)

† Car driven, in the race, by Sergio Mantovani.

Non-championship results
(key)
{{Overflow|
{{wikitable| class="wikitable" style="text-align:center; font-size:90%"
! Year
! Entrant
! Chassis
! Engine
! 1
! 2
! 3
! 4
! 5
! 6
! 7
! 8
! 9
! 10
! 11
! 12
! 13
! 14
! 15
! 16
! 17
! 18
! 19
! 20
! 21
! 22
! 23
! 24
! 25
! 26
! 27
! 28
! 29
! 30
! 31
! 32
! 33
! 34
! 35
|-
|rowspan3| 1952
!rowspan2| Giovanni Caprara
! Ferrari 166
! Ferrari 2.0 V12
| RIO
| SYR
| VAL
| RIC
| LAV
| PAU
| IBS
| MAR
| AST
| INT
| ELÄ
| NAP
| EIF
| PAR
| ALB
| FRO
| ULS
| MNZ
| LAC
| ESS
| MAR
| SAB
| CAE
|style"background:#EFCFFF"| DMT
| COM
| NAT
| BAU
|
|
|
|
|
|
|
|
|-
! Ferrari 500
! Ferrari 2.0 L4
|
|
|
|
|
|
|
|
|
|
|
|
|
|
|
|
|
|
|
|
|
|
|
|
|
|
|
|
|
|
|style"background:#CFCFFF"| MAD
| AVU
|style"background:#FFFFBF"| JOE
| NEW
| RIO
|-
! Leslie Hawthorn
! Cooper T20
! Bristol BS1 2.0 L6
|
|
|
|
|
|
|
|
|
|
|
|
|
|
|
|
|
|
|
|
|
|
|
|
|
|
|
|style"background:#EFCFFF"| MOD
| CAD
| SKA
|
|
|
|
|
|-
|rowspan2| 1953
! Connaught Engineering
! Connaught Type A
! Lea-Francis 2.0 L4
| SYR
| PAU
|style"background:#DFDFDF"| LAV
| AST
| BOR
|style"background:#DFDFDF"| INT
| ELÄ
| NAP
|style"background:#EFCFFF"| ULS
| WIN
| FRO
| COR
|style"background:#EFCFFF"| SNE
| EIF
| ALB
| PRI
|style"background:#DFFFDF"| ESS
| MID
| ROU
|style"background:#DFDFDF"| CRY
| AVU
|
| LAC
| BRI
| CHE
| SAB
| LON
|style"background:#EFCFFF"| MOD
|style"background:#FFFFBF"| MAD
|style"background:#EFCFFF"| JOE
|style"background:#EFCFFF"| CUR
|style"background:#DFDFDF"| NEW
| CAD
| RED
| SKA
|-
! Roy Salvadori
! Frazer Nash FN48
! Bristol BS 2.0 L6
|
|
|
|
|
|
|
|
|
|
|
|
|
|
|
|
|
|
|
|
|
|style"background:#CFCFFF"| USF
|
|
|
|
|
|
|
|
|
|
|
|
|
|-
| 1954
! Gilby Engineering
! Maserati 250F
! Maserati 250F1 2.5 L6
| SYR
| PAU
|style"background:#DFDFDF"| LAV
| BOR
|style"background:#CFCFFF"| INT
| BAR
|style"background:#FFFFBF"| CUR
| ROM
| FRO
| COR
|style"background:#DFDFDF"| BRC
| CRY
|style"background:#FFDF9F"| ROU
| CAE
|style"background:#DFDFDF"| AUG
| COR
|style"background:#EFCFFF"| OUL
| RED
| PES
| JOE
| CAD
| BER
|style"background:#FFDF9F"| GOO
|style"background:#CFCFFF"| DTT
|
|
|
|
|
|
|
|
|
|
|
|-
| 1955
! Gilby Engineering
! Maserati 250F
! Maserati 250F1 2.5 L6
| BUE
| VLN
| PAU
|style"background:#FFFFBF"| GLV
| BOR
|style"background:#DFDFDF"| INT
| NAP
| ALB
|style"background:#FFFFBF"| CUR
| CRN
|style"background:#FFDF9F"| LON
| DRT
|style"background:#CFCFFF"| RDX
|style"background:#FFFFBF"| DTT
|style"background:#CFCFFF"| OUL
|style"background:#CFCFFF"| AVO
|style"background:#EFCFFF"| SYR
|
|
|
|
|
|
|
|
|
|
|
|
|
|
|
|
|
|
|-
|rowspan2| 1956
! Gilby Engineering
! Maserati 250F
! Maserati 250F1 2.5 L6
| BUE
|style"background:#DFDFDF"| GLV
| SYR
| AIN
|style"background:#CFCFFF"| INT
| NAP
|
|style"background:#FFFFBF"| VNW
|style"background:#FFDF9F"| CAE|style"background:#FFDF9F"| BRH
|
|
|
|
|
|
|
|
|
|
|
|
|
|
|
|
|
|
|
|
|
|
|
|
|-
! High Efficiency Motors
! Connaught Type A
! Lea-Francis 2.0 L4
|
|
|
|
|
|
|style"background:#CFCFFF"| 100
|
|
|
|
|
|
|
|
|
|
|
|
|
|
|
|
|
|
|
|
|
|
|
|
|
|
|
|
|-
|rowspan3| 1957
! Owen Racing Organisation
! BRM P25
! BRM 2.5 L4
| BUE
| SYR
|style"background:#EFCFFF"| GLV
| NAP
|
|
|
|
|
|
|
|
|
|
|
|
|
|
|
|
|
|
|
|
|
|
|
|
|
|
|
|
|
|
|
|-
! Vandervell Products
! Vanwall VW 7
! Vanwall 254 2.5 L4
|
|
|
|
|style"background:#CFCFFF"| RMS
|
|
|
|
|
|
|
|
|
|
|
|
|
|
|
|
|
|
|
|
|
|
|
|
|
|
|
|
|
|
|-
! Cooper Car Company
! Cooper T43
! Climax FPF 2.5 L4
|
|
|
|
|
|style"background:#DFDFDF"| CAE
|style"background:#CFCFFF"| INT
| MOD
|style"background:#EFCFFF"| MOR
|
|
|
|
|
|
|
|
|
|
|
|
|
|
|
|
|
|
|
|
|
|
|
|
|
|
|-
| 1958
! Cooper Car Company
! Cooper T45
! Climax FPF 2.0 L4
| BUE
|style"background:#FFDF9F"| GLV
| SYR
|style"background:#DFFFDF"| AIN
|style"background:#DFDFDF"| INT
|
|
|
|
|
|
|
|
|
|
|
|
|
|
|
|
|
|
|
|
|
|
|
|
|
|
|
|
|
|
|-
|rowspan2| 1959
! High Efficiency Motors
! Cooper T45
! Maserati 250S 2.5 L6
|style"background:#CFCFFF"| GLV
|style"background:#EFCFFF"| AIN
|
|style"background:#DFFFDF"| OUL
|style"background:#EFCFFF"| SIL
|
|
|
|
|
|
|
|
|
|
|
|
|
|
|
|
|
|
|
|
|
|
|
|
|
|
|
|
|
|
|-
! David Brown Corporation
! Aston Martin DBR4/250
! Aston Martin RB6 2.5 L6
|
|
|style"background:#DFDFDF"| INT|
|
|
|
|
|
|
|
|
|
|
|
|
|
|
|
|
|
|
|
|
|
|
|
|
|
|
|
|
|
|
|
|-
|rowspan2| 1960
! High Efficiency Motors
! Cooper T51
! Climax FPF 2.5 L4
|style"background:#EFCFFF"| GLV
|
|style"background:#EFCFFF"| SIL
|style"background:#DFFFDF"| LOM
|style"background:#EFCFFF"| OUL|
|
|
|
|
|
|
|
|
|
|
|
|
|
|
|
|
|
|
|
|
|
|
|
|
|
|
|
|
|
|-
! David Brown Corporation
! Aston Martin DBR4/250
! Aston Martin RB6 2.5 L6
|
|style"background:#EFCFFF"| INT
|
|
|
|
|
|
|
|
|
|
|
|
|
|
|
|
|
|
|
|
|
|
|
|
|
|
|
|
|
|
|
|
|
|-
| 1961
! Yeoman Credit Racing
! Cooper T53P
! Climax FPF 1.5 L4
| LOM
|style"background:#FFDF9F"| GLV
| PAU
|style"background:#CFCFFF"| BRX
| VIE
|style"background:#CFCFFF"| AIN
|style"background:#DFFFDF"| SYR
|style"background:#CFCFFF"| NAP
|style"background:#FFFFBF"| LON|style"background:#DFFFDF"| SIL
| SOL
|style"background:#DFFFDF"| KAN
|style"background:#FFDF9F"| DAN
|style"background:#EFCFFF"| MOD
|style"background:#EFCFFF"| FLG
|style"background:#EFCFFF"| OUL
| LEW
| VAL
| RAN
| NAT
| RSA
|
|
|
|
|
|
|
|
|
|
|
|
|
|
|-
|rowspan2| 1962
!rowspan2| Bowmaker Racing
! Cooper T56
! Climax FPF 1.5 L4
| CAP
|style"background:#CFCFFF"| BRX
|style"background:#EFCFFF"| LOM
|
|
|
|
|
|
|
|
|
|
|
|
|
|
|
|
|
|
|
|
|
|
|
|
|
|
|
|
|
|
|
|
|-
! Lola Mk4
! Climax FWMV 1.5 V8
|
|
|
|style"background:#DFDFDF"| LAV
|style"background:#DFFFDF"| GLV
| PAU
|style"background:#EFCFFF"| AIN
|style"background:#EFCFFF"| INT
| NAP
| MAL
|style"background:#DFDFDF"| CLP
|style"background:#DFFFDF"| RMS
| SOL
|style"background:#DFDFDF"| KAN
| MED
|style"background:#CFCFFF"| DAN
|style"background:#EFCFFF"| OUL
|style"background:#EFCFFF"| MEX
| RAN
| NAT
|
|
|
|
|
|
|
|
|
|
|
|
|
|
|
|-
}}}}

Complete British Saloon Car Championship results
(key) (Races in bold indicate pole position; races in italics indicate fastest lap.)

 Car over 1000cc - Not eligible for points.

Complete 24 Hours of Le Mans results

Complete 12 Hours of Sebring results

Complete 24 Hours of Daytona results

Complete 12 Hours of Reims results

Complete 12 Hours of Casablanca results

References

Further reading
 Roy Salvadori/Anthony Pritchard. Roy Salvadori: Racing Driver'' Patrick Stephens. 1985 978-0850596342.

1922 births
2012 deaths
English racing drivers
English Formula One drivers
Connaught Formula One drivers
Gilby Engineering Formula One drivers
BRM Formula One drivers
Vanwall Formula One drivers
Reg Parnell Racing Formula One drivers
Aston Martin Formula One drivers
British Touring Car Championship drivers
24 Hours of Le Mans winning drivers
24 Hours of Le Mans drivers
12 Hours of Sebring drivers
12 Hours of Reims drivers
English people of Italian descent
World Sportscar Championship drivers
People from Tendring (district)
Sportspeople from Essex
Italian British racing drivers
Ecurie Ecosse drivers